Gulakamale is a village in Bangalore district, Karnataka, India, near Kaggalipura on Bangalore – Kanakapura Road. The population of the village is 2,293 which made up of 1,131 males and 1,162 females. The literacy rate is lower than that of Karnataka and stands at 71.82% as opposed to 75.36% of the rest of the state. Out of those who are literate are 81.05% male and 62.70% female populations. Scheduled Castes and Tribes make up 51.72% and 0.22% respectively.

References 

Villages in Bangalore Urban district